The 1885 Wimbledon Championships took place on the outdoor grass courts at the All England Lawn Tennis Club in Wimbledon, London, United Kingdom. The tournament ran from 4 July until 17 July. It was the 9th staging of the Wimbledon Championships, and the first Grand Slam tennis event of 1885. There was a change in the draw method, to use the Bagnall Wild system, in which all byes were restricted to the opening round, instead of being distributed through all the rounds until the final. There were 3500 spectators for the Challenge Round.

Champions

Men's singles

 William Renshaw defeated  Herbert Lawford, 7–5, 6–2, 4–6, 7–5

Women's singles

 Maud Watson defeated  Blanche Bingley, 6–1, 7–5

Men's doubles

 Ernest Renshaw /  William Renshaw defeated  Claude Farrer /  Arthur Stanley, 6–3, 6–3, 10–8

References

External links
 Official Wimbledon Championships website

 
Wimbledon Championships
Wimbledon Championships
Wimbledon Championships
July 1885 sports events